The Prince Royal's College is a private Christian school serving the education needs of over 6,000 students per year in grades kindergarten through 12th grade in Chiang Mai, Chiang Mai Province, Thailand.

History
On March 19, 1887, Rev. David G. Collins, an American missionary under Daniel McGilvary's Laos Mission of the Presbyterian Church in USA, founded the "Chiang Mai Boys School" which was the first boys school in Northern Thailand. Within ten years, the school had outgrown its facilities and a larger campus was needed. At that time a young missionary, Rev. Dr. William Harris, had taken over the management of the school and he searched for a suitable site. A large tract of land was found, and with their own money and some donations from friends, Rev. Dr. Harris and his wife purchased the land and moved the school.

On January 2, 1906, His Royal Highness, Crown Prince Maha Vajiravudh, came to the school and laid the cornerstone for the first classroom building. At this time His Royal Highness renamed the school The Prince Royal's College. He also gave the school his royal colors, white and blue.

Over the years that the Harrises were at the school (1895 to 1939), it continued to grow. Campus expansions were needed to teach the many students who wanted to study at the college. This was a great challenge for a small school that had little money. Rev. Dr. Harris, however, was never shy about asking for financial help from any foreigner or wealthy Thai he might meet, either in Thailand or during his travels abroad.

Activities
There are many different kind of activities. The ultimate aim of the activity is the development of character and making the students be skilled worker

 Scouting
The Prince Royal’s College has scouts in the course for young students. The aim of this subject is to support the students in their physical, mental and spiritual development.
On February 2, 2009, Carl XVI Gustaf of Sweden visited his honored scout in this school.

 Gifted Program
The Prince Royal’s College focuses on English, mathematics and computer programs. They have a program for gifted students or students that are interested in those subjects.

 Sufficiency economy
The Prince Royal’s College is supported by the Stock Exchange of Thailand (SET) by building activities about sufficiency economy such as “Bottle Bank”, “1 person 1 job” and “Saving money”.

 Spiritual development week
Every year, Christian Communications Institute (CCI) from Payap University has a show about the story of god and faith for moral and ethical development.

 Music night
Music night is an annual event that is held before the school closes for Christmas. This event gives students an opportunity to conduct a musical performance.

Principals, Directors and Managers

Notable alumni 
 Kasem Watthanachai - Privy Councilor
 Dr. Olarn Chaipravat - Former Vice Prime Minister
 Prof. Dr. Sa-nga Sappsri - Former Minister of Science, Technology and Energy
 Kraisorn Tantipong - Former Deputy Minister of Agriculture and Cooperatives, Former Deputy Minister of Industry and Former Member of the House of Representatives
 Chao Ratchabut (Wongtawan Na Chiang Mai) - Former Senator
 Dr. Chamroon Chailangkarn - Former Member of the House of Representatives
 So Asanajinda - Writer
 Natthaphong Samana - Thai National Team football player
 Purim Rattanaruangwattana - Actor and Singer

See also
Dara Academy, sister school
Education in Thailand
Laos Mission

References

External links
 The Prince Royal's College
 The Prince Royal's College, English Page

Christian schools in Thailand
Schools in Chiang Mai
Presbyterian schools in Asia